Georges Wildenstein (16 March 1892 – 11 June 1963) was a French gallery owner, art dealer, art collector, editor and art historian.

Life 
Georges' father was Nathan Wildenstein, who came from a family of Jewish cattle-dealers but had in 1870 left Alsace aged twenty when it was annexed by the German Empire in the Franco-Prussian War and moved to Paris. There he based himself in a tailor's house and served as an intermediary for a client who was selling paintings.

In 1905 he set up a gallery on Rue La Boétie, and a stable of racing horses. Georges began work at his father's gallery and became interested in Picasso's paintings and a friend of Monet. Nathan bought Georges a separate business at 21 rue de la Boétie where Georges was a partner of dealer Paul Rosenberg who represented Picasso, and he also opened a gallery on New Bond Street in London.

He edited the Gazette des Beaux-Arts review founded by Charles Blanc, and founded the revue Arts himself. Specialising in French paintings, he published several works on French art and wrote catalogues raisonné of the works of Gauguin and Chardin.

The family was stripped of French nationality in 1940 and fled to the United States, with their Paris gallery "aryanized". After the war Georges was accused of theft and trading with the Nazis but the family fought and refuted the action brought against them by Daniel Malraux.

In 1963 he was elected to the Académie des Beaux-Arts, succeeding Paul Léon. Malraux's father André Malraux voted against his election. His son Daniel Wildenstein took over as head of the gallery and editor of the Gazette des Beaux-Arts.

See also 
 Guy Wildenstein

References

Further reading

External links 
 1998 Vanity Fair article about Wildenstein

1892 births
1963 deaths
French art historians
French art dealers
19th-century French Jews
Members of the Académie des beaux-arts
Subjects of Nazi art appropriations
French male writers
Businesspeople from Paris
20th-century French male writers